The Administrative Procedure Act (APA), is the United States federal statute that governs the way in which administrative agencies of the federal government of the United States may propose and establish regulations and it grants U.S. federal courts oversight over all agency actions.  According to Hickman & Pierce, it is one of the most important pieces of United States administrative law, and serves as a sort of "constitution" for U.S. administrative law.

The APA applies to both the federal executive departments and the independent agencies. U.S. Senator Pat McCarran called the APA "a bill of rights for the hundreds of thousands of Americans whose affairs are controlled or regulated" by federal government agencies. The text of the APA can be found under Title 5 of the United States Code, beginning at Section 500.

There is a similar Model State Administrative Procedure Act (Model State APA), which was drafted by the National Conference of Commissioners on Uniform State Laws for oversight of state agencies. Not all states have adopted the model law wholesale, as of 2017. The federal APA does not require systematic oversight of regulations prior to adoption, unlike the Model APA. Each US state has passed its own version of the Administrative Procedure Act.

Historical background

 
Beginning in 1933, President Franklin D. Roosevelt and the Democratic Congress enacted several statutes that created new federal agencies as part of the New Deal legislative plan, established to guide the United States through the social and economic hardship caused by the Great Depression. However, the Congress became concerned about the expanding powers that these autonomous federal agencies now possessed, resulting in the enactment of the APA to regulate, standardize and oversee these federal agencies.

The APA was born in a contentious political environment. Professor George Shepard claims that Roosevelt's opponents and supporters fought over passage of the APA "in a pitched political battle for the life of the New Deal" itself. Shepard notes, however, that a legislative balance was struck with the APA, expressing "the nation's decision to permit extensive government, but to avoid dictatorship and central planning."

A 1946 House of Representatives report discusses the 10-year period of "painstaking and detailed study and drafting" that went into the APA. Because of rapid growth in the administrative regulation of private conduct, Roosevelt ordered several studies of administrative methods and conduct during the early part of his four-term presidency. Based on one study, Roosevelt commented that the practice of creating administrative agencies with the authority to perform both legislative and judicial work "threatens to develop a fourth branch of government for which there is no sanction in the Constitution."

In 1939,  Roosevelt requested for Attorney General Frank Murphy to form a committee to investigate practices and procedures in American administrative law and suggest improvements. That committee's report, the Final Report of Attorney General's Committee on Administrative Procedure, contained detailed information about the development and procedures of the federal agencies.

The Final Report defined a federal agency as a governmental unit with "the power to determine... private rights and obligations" by rulemaking or adjudication. The report applied that definition to the largest units of the federal government, and identified "nine executive departments and eighteen independent agencies." Overall, 51 federal agencies were identified in the report after including various subdivisions within the larger units. In reviewing the history of federal agencies, the Final Report noted that almost all agencies had undergone changes in name and political function.

Of the 51 federal agencies discussed in the Final Report, 11 were created by statute before the American Civil War. From 1865 to 1900, six new agencies were created, notably the Interstate Commerce Commission in 1887 in response to widespread criticism of the railroad industry. From 1900 to 1930, seventeen agencies were created by statute, and eighteen more had been created since. The Final Report made several recommendations about standardizing administrative procedures, but Congress delayed action as the US entered World War II.

Since 2005, the House Judiciary Committee has been undertaking an Administrative Law, Process and Procedure Project to consider changes to the Administrative Procedure Act.

Basic purposes
Although each US government agency is constituted within one branch of the government (judicial, legislative, or executive), an agency's authority often extends into the functions of other branches. Without careful regulation, that can lead to unchecked authority in a particular area of government, violating the separation of powers, a concern that Roosevelt himself acknowledged. To provide constitutional safeguards, the APA creates a framework for regulating agencies and their roles. According to the Attorney General's Manual on the Administrative Procedure Act, drafted after the 1946 enactment of the APA, the basic purposes of the APA are the following:
to require agencies to keep the public informed of their organization, procedures and rules;
to provide for public participation in the rulemaking process, for instance through public commenting;
to establish uniform standards for the conduct of formal rulemaking and adjudication;
to define the scope of judicial review.

The APA's provisions apply to many federal governmental institutions and agencies. The APA in 5 U.S.C. 551(1) defines an "agency" as "each authority of the Government of the United States, whether or not it is within or subject to review by another agency," with the exception of several enumerated authorities, including Congress, federal courts, and governments of territories or possessions of the United States. Courts have also held that the U.S. president is not an agency under the APA. The APA's capacity to hold accountable regulatory business monitors that oversee civil matters  that apply  "'soft' administrative law" is also limited.

The Final Report organized federal administrative action into two parts: adjudication and rulemaking. Agency adjudication was broken down further into two distinct phases of formal and informal adjudication. Formal adjudication involve a trial-like hearing with witness testimony, a written record, and a final decision. Under informal adjudication, agency decisions are made without these formal procedures, instead using "inspections, conferences and negotiations." Because formal adjudication produces a record of proceedings and a final decision, it may be subject to judicial review. As for rulemaking resulting in agency rules and regulations, the Final Report noted that many agencies provided due process through hearings and investigations, but there was still a need for well-defined uniform standards for agency adjudication and rulemaking procedures.

Standard of judicial review
 
The APA requires that to set aside agency actions that are not subject to formal trial-like procedures, the court must conclude that the regulation is "arbitrary and capricious, an abuse of discretion, or otherwise not in accordance with the law."  However, Congress may further limit the scope of judicial review of agency actions by including such language in the organic statute. To set aside formal rulemaking or formal adjudication for which procedures are trial-like, a different standard of review allows courts to question agency actions more strongly. For such more formal actions, agency decisions must be supported by "substantial evidence" after the court reads the "whole record," which can be thousands of pages long.

Unlike arbitrary and capricious review, substantial evidence review gives the courts leeway to consider whether an agency's factual and policy determinations were warranted in light of all the information before the agency at the time of decision. Accordingly, arbitrary and capricious review is understood to be more deferential to agencies than substantial evidence review is. Arbitrary and capricious review allows agency decisions to stand as long as an agency can give a reasonable explanation for its decision based on the information that it had at the time. In contrast, the courts tend to look much harder at decisions resulting from trial-like procedures because they resemble actual trial-court procedures, but Article III of the Constitution reserves the judicial powers for actual courts. Accordingly, courts are strict under the substantial evidence standard when agencies act like courts, because being strict gives courts the final say, preventing agencies from using too much judicial power in violation of separation of powers.

The separation of powers doctrine is less of an issue with rulemaking that is not subject to trial-like procedures. Such rulemaking gives agencies more leeway in court because it is similar to the legislative process reserved for Congress. The courts' main role is then to ensure that agency rules conform to the Constitution and the agency's statutory powers. Even if a court finds a rule unwise, it will stand as long as it is not "arbitrary, capricious, an abuse of discretion, or otherwise not in accordance with the law."

Publication of regulations
Rules and regulations issued or proposed (see Notice of Proposed Rulemaking below) by federal administrative agencies are published chronologically in the Federal Register. Promulgated rules and regulations are then organized by topic in a separate publication called the Code of Federal Regulations.

See also

Notice of proposed rulemaking
Regulatory Flexibility Act
Administrative Law Review
Constitutional law
California Administrative Procedure Act of 1945

References

External links
 As codified in 5 U.S.C. chapter 5 of the United States Code from the US House of Representatives
 As codified in 5 U.S.C. chapter 5 of the United States Code from the LII
Attorney General's Manual on the Administrative Procedure Act
Legal Information Institute administrative law overview
Key administrative law decisions by the US Supreme Court
Federal administrative agency index via Washburn School of Law
Administrative Law Review published by Washington College of Law, American University and the American Bar Association
 Cybertelecom :: Administrative Procedures Act

New Deal legislation
United States federal government administration legislation
1946 in law
United States federal policy